KAJN-CD, virtual channel 40 (UHF digital channel 19), is a low-powered, Class A television station licensed to Lafayette, Louisiana, United States, affiliated with The Walk TV. The station is owned by the Rice Capital Broadcasting Company.

Repeaters
KAJN-CD has two repeaters; both of these are Class A.

External links
 
 
 

AJN-CD
Television channels and stations established in 1992
Low-power television stations in the United States